Fleggburgh, also known as Burgh St Margaret, is a village and civil parish in the English county of Norfolk.

History
Burgh's St. Margaret's and Fleggburgh's names are both of Anglo-Saxon origin and derive from the Old English for either the fortification of Saint Margaret or of Flegg.

In the Domesday Book, Burgh St. Margaret is listed as a settlement of 63 households in the hundred of West Flegg. In 1086, the village was divided between the East Anglian estates of King William I, Roger Bigod, Bishop William of Thetford and St Benet's Abbey.

During the Second World War, several pillboxes and a guardhouse were built across the parish to defend the crossing of the River Bure in the event of a German invasion of Great Britain.

Geography
According to the 2011 Census, Fleggburgh has a population of 319 residents living in 164 households.

Fleggburgh falls within the constituency of Great Yarmouth and is represented at Parliament by Brandon Lewis MP of the Conservative Party. For the purposes of local government, the parish falls within the district of Great Yarmouth.

Fleggburgh is located on the western edge of the Trinity Broads, a Site of Special Scientific Interest, within The Broads National Park.

St. Margaret's Church
Fleggburgh's parish church is dedicated to Saint Margaret and was built in the Nineteenth Century on the site of previous worship under the oversight of Herbert John Green. The interior holds a brass memorial to Richard Burton who served as Rector of the parish in the early-Seventeenth Century and stained-glass installed in the 1960s by Paul Jeffries, depicting Saint Margaret, Saint Luke and Saint Mary.

Amenities
The majority of local children attend Fleggburgh CofE Primary School which was rated by Ofsted as a 'Good' school in 2012, a decision which was upheld in 2017.

Fleggburgh has one public houses that remains in business- the Kings Arms. The Kings Arms has stood on its current site since the late-Eighteenth Century, except for a short period in the early-Nineteenth Century when a license was refused to Mrs Mary Puxley on the grounds of aiding and assisting a riot that led to the cruel wounding and beating of Mr Robert Chasteney, a local surveyor.

War Memorial
Fleggburgh's and Billockby's war memorial takes the form of a Celtic cross mounted on a tiered base, located inside St. Margaret's Churchyard. The memorial was unveiled in December 1922 by the widow of Mrs Janet Fisher, husband of Captain Fisher listed below. The memorial lists the following names for the First World War:

 Cpt. George K. T. Fisher (1879-1917), 1/4th Bn., Royal Norfolk Regiment
 Sgt. W. J. Hardiman (1889-1918), 1st (Provisional) Coy., Royal Engineers
 Eng. John F. Miller (1887-1918), H.M. Drifter Cosmos
 Gnr. Robert Dyble (d.1918), Royal Field Artillery, att. 25th Division Ammunition Column
 Mec-2c. Robert G. Waters (1897-1918), 11th (Reserve) Lorry Park, Royal Air Force
 Pvt. A. J. Gowing (d.1919), Royal Army Service Corps, att. Royal Field Artillery
 Pvt. Jonathan B. Saunders (d.1917), 4th Bn., Bedfordshire Regiment
 Pvt. Arthur W. Turner (1890-1917), 10th Bn., Royal Fusiliers
 Pvt. Herbert J. Turner (1900-1918), 17th Bn., Royal Fus.
 Pvt. William E. Durrant (d.1918), 2/6th Bn., Manchester Regiment
 Pvt. Frederick G. Gowing (1891-1917), 1/4th Bn., Royal Norfolk Regiment
 Pvt. Albert H. Narburgh (1881-1914), 1/4th Bn., Royal Norfolk Regt.
 Pvt. Matthew Blogg (1873-1917), 8th Bn., Royal Norfolk Regt.
 Rfn. George E. Tooke (1876-1917), 15th (Civil Service Rifles) Bn., London Regiment
 Mr. William Waters (1878-1914), Trawler Copious
 T. G. Carter

And, the following for the Second World War:

 2-Lt. Michael J. C. Fisher (1920-1940), 2nd Bn., Royal Fusiliers
 F/O. Basil M. Fisher (1916-1940), No. 111 Squadron RAF
 W/O. Gordon H. Jackson (1923-1943), No. 139 Squadron RAF
 F/Sgt. James H. W. Durrant (1922-1944), Royal Air Force
 Sgt. Walter G. Gedge (1926-1945), No. 189 Squadron RAF
 AC-1c. Alfred P. Cooper (1920-1940), Royal Air Force
 Pvt. Geoffrey C. Baldwin (1922-1944), 1st Bn., Royal Norfolk Regiment
 Pvt. Leon P. Leban (1915-1944), 2nd Bn., Royal Norfolk Regt.
 Smn. Edwin J. Smith (1916-1940), HMS Pintail
 Vol. Frank R. Paul (1893-1942), 11th (Norfolk) Battalion, Home Guard
 W. H. Quantrill

References

External links

 Fleggburgh Parish Council
.
Information from Genuki Norfolk on Burgh St Margaret.

Villages in Norfolk
Borough of Great Yarmouth
Civil parishes in Norfolk